Thomas Williams Chance (1872 - 1954) was a Baptist minister and was principal at Cardiff Baptist College. He was born in Cardiff and died in 1954 after an operation at Hereford County Hospital. Chance was an enthusiastic and well respected member of the Baptist community in Cardiff. He was a member of Albany Road Church in Cardiff and was Chairman of the city's Baptist Board for 21 years. From 1934 to 1935 he served as President of the East Glamorgan Baptist Association and he was also supportive of the missionary work of the Christian Endeavour Society.

References 

19th-century Welsh Baptist ministers
20th-century Welsh Baptist ministers
Welsh schoolteachers
1872 births
1954 deaths
Clergy from Cardiff